Po Tin is one of the 31 constituencies in the Tuen Mun District.

Created for the 2003 District Council elections, the constituency returns one district councillor to the Tuen Mun District Council, with an election every four years.

Po Tin loosely covers areas surrounding Grand Villa, Kei Lun Wai, Ming Wong Garden, Po Tin Estate, Po Tong Ha, Po Wah Garden and Siu Hang Tsuen in Tuen Mun with an estimated population of 15,431.

Councillors represented

Election results

2010s

References

Tuen Mun
Constituencies of Hong Kong
Constituencies of Tuen Mun District Council
2003 establishments in Hong Kong
Constituencies established in 2003